Mehdi Ben Cheikh (born 13 May 1979) is a Tunisian male volleyball player. He is part of the Tunisia men's national volleyball team. He competed with the national team at the 2012 Summer Olympics in London, Great Britain. He played with E.S. Tunis in 2012 and competed at the 2014 FIVB Volleyball Men's Club World Championship.

He competed at the 2020 Summer Olympics.

Clubs
  E.S. Tunis (2012)

See also
 Tunisia at the 2012 Summer Olympics

References

External links

1979 births
Living people
Tunisian men's volleyball players
Place of birth missing (living people)
Volleyball players at the 2012 Summer Olympics
Olympic volleyball players of Tunisia
Volleyball players at the 2020 Summer Olympics